"Oh Yeah" is the first single from Trinidadian American female hip-hop artist Foxy Brown's third album Broken Silence.

Single information
"Oh Yeah" was officially released on May 4, 2001 in the United States. Initially, it was released through the mixtape circuit in late 2000 with alternate lyrics- most notably on Foxy Brown's Best Of Foxy Brown mixtape in 2000, hosted by DJ Envy.

The single was unsuccessful, receiving little airplay on urban radio stations (though popular on New York City and the upper East Coast urban stations) and little video rotation on MTV, though it was slightly more successful on BET. It missed the Billboard Hot 100 and peaked on the R&B/Hip-Hop Singles & Track Chart at number 63.

However, "Oh Yeah" is widely credited as the first song to kick off the Hip Hop/Dancehall movement in the early 2000s. The song is now considered a Hip Hop classic and one of Foxy Brown's signature songs.

The single contained 4 tracks on the single:

 Oh Yeah (radio edit) [4:00]
 Oh Yeah (album version) [4:22]
 BK Anthem (radio edit) [4:19]
 BK Anthem (album version) [4:19]

The single featured a sample of the song "54-46 That's My Number" by the Jamaican reggae and ska band Toots & the Maytals. The U.K. version of the single is enhanced and contains a music video of "Oh Yeah," playable when inserted into a computer. Another version of the single was released without "BK Anthem" and with an alternate cover. The track list for this single is as follows:

 Oh Yeah (radio edit) [4:00]
 Oh Yeah (album version) [4:22]
 Oh Yeah (instrumental) [4:22]

Music video
The music video was shot in Jamaica in the middle of 2001. It starts with Foxy Brown rapping in a forest near the river and later with her then boyfriend and the track's featuring artist Spragga Benz. The second verse shows her at a party with her group Fox 5 (which includes her older brother Gavin Marchand). The song ends with Brown on the stage dancing and performing in front of a crowd. Towards the end of the verse of the performance, a snippet of "Tables Will Turn," a song from Broken Silence comes on briefly.

B-Side
"BK Anthem", a song that was originally recorded and released as a street single in late 2000 was released as a B-side to the "Oh Yeah"s single. The music video was shot with a camcorder style. The song peaked at number 82 on the U.S. Billboard R&B charts and failed to make the Billboard Hot 100.

Weekly charts

Year-end charts

References

External links
 Foxy Brown's Official Twitter Page
 Foxy Brown's Reverbnation Page
 Foxy Brown's Fan Site
 Foxy Brown's Fan Forum

2001 singles
Def Jam Recordings singles
Foxy Brown (rapper) songs
2000 songs
Songs written by Bob Marley
Songs written by Toots Hibbert
Songs written by Foxy Brown (rapper)